Sanandaj County is in Kurdistan province, Iran. The capital of the county is Sanandaj. At the 2006 census, the county's population was 409,628 in 105,247 households. The following census in 2011 counted 450,167 people in 127,699 households. At the 2016 census, the county's population was 501,402 in 152,532 households, by which time Hoseynabad-e Shomali Rural District had been separated from Divandarreh County to join Sanandaj County.

Administrative divisions

The population history and structural changes of Sanandaj County's administrative divisions over three consecutive censuses are shown in the following table. The latest census shows four districts, 12 rural districts, and two cities.

References

 

Counties of Kurdistan Province